In psychology, desensitization is a treatment or process that diminishes emotional responsiveness to a negative, aversive, or positive stimulus after repeated exposure to it. Desensitization can also occur when an emotional response is repeatedly evoked in situations in which the action tendency that is associated with the emotion proves irrelevant or unnecessary. The process of desensitization was developed by psychologist Mary Cover Jones, and is primarily used to assist individuals in unlearning phobias and anxieties. Joseph Wolpe (1958) developed a method of a hierarchal list of anxiety evoking stimuli in order of intensity, which allows individuals to undergo adaption. Although medication is available for individuals with anxiety, fear, or phobias, empirical evidence supports desensitization with high rates of cure, particularly in clients with depression or schizophrenia.

Steps 
The hierarchical list is constructed between client and therapist in rank ordered series of steps from the least disturbing to the most disturbing fears or phobias. Secondly the client is taught techniques that produce deep relaxation. It is impossible to feel both anxiety and relaxation at the same time, so easing the client into deep relaxation helps inhibit any feelings of anxiety. Systematic desensitization (a guided reduction in fear, anxiety or aversion) can then be achieved by gradually approaching the feared stimulus while maintaining relaxation. Desensitization works best when individuals are directly exposed to the stimuli and situations they fear so anxiety-evoking stimuli are paired with inhibitory responses. This is carried out either by clients performing in real life situations (known as vivo desensitization), or, if it is not practical to directly act out the steps of hierarchy, by clients observing models performing the feared behaviour (known as vicarious desensitization). Clients slowly move up the hierarchy, repeating performances if necessary, until the last item on the list is performed without fear or anxiety.

Suggested Mechanisms

Reciprocal Inhibition 
The theory that "two opposing states cannot occur simultaneously" i.e. relaxation methods that are involved with desensitization inhibit feelings of anxiety that come with being exposed to phobic stimuli.  Deep muscle relaxation techniques are the primary method used by Wolpe in order to increase parasympathetic nervous system activity, the nervous system the body uses to relax.  

One criticism is that reciprocal inhibition isn't a necessary part of the process in desensitizing people as other therapies that are along similar lines, such as flooding, work without pre-emptive, inhibitory relaxation techniques. A review of empirical evidence confirmed that therapy without relaxation was equally effective and this gave birth to exposure therapy.

A review of Taylor's (2002) classification of reciprocal inhibition as being short-term but with long term effects within the understanding of desensitization doesn't make sense due to it being theoretically similar to reactive inhibition which is longer term as it develops conditioned inhibition.

Counterconditioning 
Counterconditioning suggests that the anxiety response is replaced by a relaxation response through conditioning during the desensitization process. Counterconditioning is the behavioural equivalent of reciprocal inhibition which is understood as a neurological process. Wolpe (1958) used this mechanism to explain the long-term effects of systematic desensitization as it reduces avoidance responses and therefore excessive avoidance behaviours contributing to anxiety disorders. However, this explanation is not supported by empirical evidence.

For similar reasons to reciprocal inhibition, counterconditioning is criticized as the underpinning mechanism for desensitization due to therapies that don't suggest a replacement emotion for anxiety being effective in desensitizing people. It is to be noted that there would be no behavioural difference between if reciprocal inhibition or counterconditioning were the functioning mechanisms.

Habituation 
This theory explains that with increased exposure to stimulus there will be a decreased response from the phobic subject. There is empirical evidence to suggest that overall phobia responses are decreased in people who have specific phobias with in vivo exposure, however, empirical evidence does not support habituation as an explanation of desensitization due to its reversible and short-term nature.

Extinction 
Phobic responses are decreased after exposure to stimuli without avoidance and with a lack of a reinforcement. However, this cannot be used as an explanation for why desensitization works as it solely describes the functional relationship between absent reinforcement and phobic responses and lacks an actual mechanism for why such relationship exists.

Wolpe disagreed that extinction could be the explanatory mechanism of how desensitization occurs with therapies based on exposure as he believed that repeated exposure was insufficient and had likely been already happened during the people with specific phobia's lives.

Two-Factor Model 
Exposure to phobic stimuli and then a subsequent avoidance response may strengthen the future anxiety as the avoidance response reduces the anxiety which therefore reinforces the avoidant behaviour (prominent feature of specific phobias and anxiety disorders). Therefore, exposure with non-avoidance seen as essential in the desensitization process.

Self-Efficacy 
This is the view that a persons' belief in themselves of being able to cope increases, especially when moving up the exposure hierarchy and having confirmatory experiences of being able to cope from the lower levels. The increase in self-efficacy then explains fear reduction i.e. desensitization to stimuli.

This mechanism as an explanation for desensitization lacks an explanation for how increased expectation of fear reduction actually leads to reduced fear responses and how if a person didn't actually experience a reduced fear response whether desensitization will have occurred as their anxiety response will reaffirm their phobia.

Expectancy Theory 
This theory suggests that because people expect that the therapy is going to work and change their view on how they are going to receive the phobic stimuli after speaking with the therapist, their responses will align with that and display reduced anxiety Marcia et al. (1969) found that those with high expectancy change (receiving full expectancy treatment) had comparable results to those who had systematic desensitization therapy suggesting its just a change in expectancy that reduces fear responses.

Emotional Processing Theory 
R.J McNally explains "fear is represented in memory as a network comprising stimulus propositions that express information about feared cues, response propositions that express information about behavioural and physiologic responses to these cues, and meaning propositions that elaborate on the significance of other elements in the fear structure". Excessive fear such as phobias can be understood as a problem in this structure which lead to problems processing information leading to exaggerated fear responses. Using this information about fear networks, desensitization can be achieved accessing the fear network using matching stimuli to information in the fear network and then having the person engage with the stimuli to input new information into the network by disconfirming existing propositons.

Neuroscience

Medial Prefrontal Cortex 
The medial prefrontal cortex works with the amygdala and when damaged, a phobic subject will find desensitization more difficult to achieve. Neurons in this area aren't fired during the desensitization process despite reducing spontaneous fear responses when artificially fired suggesting the area stores extinction memories that reduce phobic responses to future stimuli related to the phobia (conditioned) which explains the long-term impact of desensitization.

N-methyl-D-aspartate Glutamatergic Receptors 
NMDA receptors have been found to play a key role in extinction of fear and therefore the use of an agonist would accelerate the reduction in fear responses during the process of desensitization.

Criticism and Developments 
With the widespread research and development of behavioural therapies and experiments being conducted in order to understand the mechanisms driving desensitization, a consensus often arises that exposure is the key element of desensitization. This suggests the steps leading up to the actual exposure such as relaxation techniques and the development of an exposure hierarchy are redundant steps for effective desensitization.

Effects on animals 

Animals can also be desensitized to their rational or irrational fears. A race horse who fears the starting gate can be desensitized to the fearful elements (the creak of the gate, the starting bell, the enclosed space) one at a time, in small doses or at a distance. Clay et al. (2009) conducted an experiment whereby he allocated rhesus macaques to either a desensitization group or a control group, finding that those in the desensitization group showed a significant reduction in both the rate and duration of fearful behavior. This supports the use of PRT training. Desensitization is commonly used with simple phobias like insect phobia. In addition, desensitization therapy has been shown to be a useful tool in training domesticated dogs. Systematic desensitization used in conjunction with counter-conditioning was shown to reduce problem behaviours in dogs, such as vocalization and property destruction.

Effects on violence 

Desensitization also refers to the potential for reduced responsiveness to actual violence caused by exposure to violence in the media, although this topic is debated in the scientific literature on the topic. Desensitization may arise from different sources of media, including TV, video games and movies. Some scholars suggest that violence may prime thoughts of hostility, with the possibility of affecting the way we perceive others and interpret their actions.

It is hypothesized that initial exposure to violence in the media may produce a number of aversive responses such as increased heart rate, fear, discomfort, perspiration and disgust. However, prolonged and repeated exposure to violence in the media may reduce or habituate the initial psychological impact until violent images do not elicit these negative responses. Eventually the observer may become emotionally and cognitively desensitized to media violence. In one experiment, participants who played violent video games showed lower heart rate and galvanic skin response readings, which the authors interpreted as displaying a physiological desensitization to violence. However, other studies have failed to replicate this finding. Some scholars have questioned whether becoming desensitized to media violence specifically transfers to becoming desensitized to real-life violence.

See also 

 Sensitization
 Flooding (psychology)
 Extinction (psychology)
 Habituation
 Conditioning

References 

Anxiety disorder treatment
Behavior therapy
Behaviorism